The 1971 Washington State Cougars football team was an American football team that represented Washington State University in the Pacific-8 Conference (Pac-8) during the 1971 NCAA University Division football season. Led by fourth-year head coach Jim Sweeney, they compiled a 4–7 record (2–5 in Pac-8, seventh), and were outscored 286 to 246.

The team's statistical leaders included junior quarterback Ty Payne with 1,206 passing yards, senior running back Bernard Jackson with 1,189 rushing yards, and wide receiver Ike Nelson with 349 receiving yards.

The Cougars defeated tenth-ranked Stanford, the defending and future Rose Bowl champions, in Palo Alto on October 23, but lost their third straight Apple Cup. Washington State did not play the Battle of the Palouse in 1971, and neighbor Idaho had their best season to date, winning eight consecutive games.

Schedule

Roster

All-conference

Four Washington State seniors were named to the All-Pacific-8 team: halfback Bernard Jackson, guard Steve Busch, cornerback Ron Mims, and placekicker Don Sweet. Busch was a repeat selection.

NFL Draft
Two Cougars were selected in the 1972 NFL Draft

References

External links
  Game program: Arizona vs. WSU at Spokane – September 18, 1971
 Game program: UCLA vs. WSU at Spokane – October 9, 1971
 Game program: Oregon vs. WSU at Spokane – October 30, 1971

Washington State
Washington State Cougars football seasons
Washington State Cougars football